James Dykes was a Scotland international rugby union player.

Rugby Union career

Amateur career

He also played for Glasgow Academicals RFC.

International career

He played five matches for the Barbarians from 1925 to 1928.

Family

His brother Andrew was also capped for Scotland.

He was the nephew of John Dykes, who was also capped for Scotland.

References

Sources

 Bath, Richard (ed.) The Scotland Rugby Miscellany (Vision Sports Publishing Ltd, 2007 )

1901 births
1967 deaths
Scottish rugby union players
Scotland international rugby union players
Glasgow Academicals rugby union players
Barbarian F.C. players
Rugby union players from Partick
Rugby union centres